Cristián Reyes (born 5 August 1986) is a Chilean sprinter who specializes in the 200 metres.

Biography
He competed in the 200 metres event at the 2008 Olympic Games, but without reaching the final round.

His personal best time is 20.66 seconds, achieved in April 2008 in Santiago. He also has 10.55 seconds in the 100 metres, achieved in May 2007 in Santiago.

Personal bests
100 m: 10.48 s (wind: +2.0 m/s) –  Buenos Aires, 27 March 2010
200 m: 20.65 s (wind: +0.2 m/s) –  Guadalajara, 26 October 2011
400 m: 47.31 s  –  Santiago, 13 October 2007

Competition record

References

External links

1986 births
Living people
Chilean male sprinters
Athletes (track and field) at the 2008 Summer Olympics
Athletes (track and field) at the 2012 Summer Olympics
Athletes (track and field) at the 2011 Pan American Games
Athletes (track and field) at the 2015 Pan American Games
Pan American Games competitors for Chile
Olympic athletes of Chile
Sportspeople from Concepción, Chile
South American Games silver medalists for Chile
South American Games medalists in athletics
Competitors at the 2006 South American Games
21st-century Chilean people